"Live for Loving You" is a song by Cuban–American singer-songwriter Gloria Estefan. It was released in September 1991 worldwide as the fifth and final single from her second solo album, Into the Light (1991). The song was written by Estefan, her husband Emilio Estefan, Jr. and Diane Warren, and produced by Estefan, Jr., Jorge Casas and Clay Ostwald. Estefan dedicated the song to her husband, like she did with "Coming Out of the Dark", "How Can I Be Sure" and "Hoy". "Live for Loving You" peaked at number 22 on the US Billboard Hot 100 and was the first single from the album to appear on the dance music charts.

Critical reception
Scottish Aberdeen Press and Journal wrote that "Live for Loving You" has a "great feel to it and nice vocals from the Latin American queen of rock. Makes you feel as though like you’re on a tropical island". In an retrospective review, Matthew Hocter from Albumism named it as one of three singles, that "truly stand out" of the album, noting its "infectious pop sound". Also AllMusic editor Jason Birchmeier higlighted the song, with its "memorable" and "cooing singalong". Larry Flick from Billboard declared it as a "formidable return to her dance roots." Henderson and DeVaney from Cashbox called it a "happy, innocuous, mid-tempo, slightly Caribbean-flavored pop song". 

The Daily Vault's Mark Millan viewed it as a "sweet" song, picking it as one of three "real hits" of the album, with "Coming Out of the Dark" and "Seal Our Fate". Pan-European magazine Music & Media constated that Estefan "waits for the second verse to add her well known Latin influences. Up to then, the overall feel is more African. Suddenly a piano slips in and the rhythm changes slightly. This clever arrangement adds to the song's excitement." A reviewer from Music Week described it as a "bouncy insubstantial number which recalls her earlier work", and added, "A hit for sure".

Music video
A music video was produced to promote the single. It is set in an animated Miami setting and features Gloria's Dalmatian dog, her husband, and her son. A video was also produced for the "Underground Remix". The original video is included in the Everlasting Gloria video collection.

Official versions and remixes
Original Versions
 Album Version  — (4:37)
 2007 iTunes Originals Version  — (4:14)

Pablo Flores & Javier Garza Remixes
 Single Remix (aka Remix) — (4:19)
 Pablo Flores 12" — (7:10)
 South of the Border Mix  — (7:11)
 South of the Border Percapella — (4:37)

Tommy Musto Remixes
 Underground Club Remix  — (7:16)
 Underground Club Edit — (4:30)
 Live For Clubbing You — (6:35)
 Live For Dubbing You — (4:35)

John Haag Remixes
 John Haag's 12" — (6:49)

Charts

Formats and track listings

Release history

References

External links

1991 singles
Gloria Estefan songs
Songs written by Diane Warren
Songs written by Emilio Estefan
Songs written by Gloria Estefan
1990 songs
1991 songs
Dance-pop songs
Epic Records singles